Helene or Hélène may refer to:

People
Helene (given name), a Greek feminine given name
Helen of Troy, the daughter of Zeus and Leda
Helene, a figure in Greek mythology who was a friend of Aphrodite and helped her seduce Adonis
Helene (Amazon), a daughter of Tityrus and an Amazon who fought Achilles and died after he seriously wounded her
Helene, the consort of Simon Magus in Adversus Haereses
 Hélène (given name), a feminine given name, the French version of Helen
Hélène (singer), Hélène Rollès

Astronomy
Helene (moon), a moon of Saturn

Books and film
 Hélène (drama), an 1891 play by Paul Delair
 Helene, English edition of German novel by Vicki Baum
 Hélène (film), a 1936 French drama film, based on the novel by Baum

Music
 Hélène (opera), an opera by Camille Saint-Saëns 1904
Polka Hélène in D minor for piano 4 hands by Borodin
 Hélène (album), an album by Roch Voisine 1989
 Hélène (Hélène Rollès album) album by Hélène Rollès 1992
 Hélène, album by Hélène Segara 2002
 "Hélène" (song), a 1989 song by  Roch Voisine
 "Hélène", song by Julien Clerc 1987

Other
 Tropical Storm Helene, various storms

See also
Helena (disambiguation)
Helen (disambiguation)
Eleni (disambiguation)
Ellen (disambiguation)